Wilhelm Iwan Friederich August von Gloeden (September 16, 1856 – February 16, 1931), commonly known as Baron von Gloeden, was a German photographer who worked mainly in Italy. He is mostly known for his pastoral nude studies of Sicilian boys, which usually featured props such as wreaths or amphoras, suggesting a setting in the Greece or Italy of antiquity. From a modern standpoint, his work is commendable due to his controlled use of lighting as well as the often elegant poses of his models. His innovations include the use of photographic filters and special body makeup (a mixture of milk, olive oil, and glycerin) to disguise skin blemishes. His work, both landscapes and nudes, drew wealthy tourists to Sicily, particularly gay men uncomfortable in northern Europe, and changed the history of Taormina.

Early life
Wilhelm von Gloeden was self-invented. He claimed to be the son of an officer and baron from Mecklenburg, and gave a "Schloss Volkshagen near Wismar" as his place of birth. However, there was no such castle. He was indeed born into a Mecklenburg branch of the noble family von Gloeden, but his title was false: the von Gloeden line that held the barony is well-documented. 

His father was Hermann von Gloeden (1820-1862), who in 1851 was a forest ranger in Volkshagen (today Völkshagen, near Marlow east of Rostock), and in 1856 became a forest inspector in Dargun. His mother, Charlotte, née Maassen, had previously been married to Johann Magnus Wilhelm Raabe. 
 
After the death of his father, his mother married for a third time, to Wilhelm Joachim von Hammerstein in 1864. Hammerstein (1838-1904) had been mentored by Carl Hermann von Gloeden, and his forestry career led to him becoming politician of the German Conservative Party and editor-in-chief of the Kreuzzeitung. Von Gloeden described the relationship with his stepfather as not good. The most important family connection for Wilhelm was his half-sister Sophie Raabe from his mother's first marriage, who lived with him in Sicily for years.
 
After studying art history in Rostock (1876), Gloeden studied painting under  at the Weimar Saxon-Grand Ducal Art School (1876–77) until he was forced by lung disease (apparently tuberculosis) to interrupt his studies for a year, convalescing at a sanatorium in the mountain resort of Görbersdorf, now known as Sokołowsko in Poland.

Taormina

In a search for health, he travelled to Italy (1877–78), first staying in Naples and visiting Capri before moving on to Taormina in Sicily.  He lodged at the Hotel Vittoria before buying a house near San Domenico Convent.  Apart from the period 1915–18, during the First World War, when he was forced to leave Italy to avoid internment as an enemy alien, he remained in Taormina until his death in 1931. Gregory Woods, scholar of LGBT studies, credited von Gloeden with transformative powers: "Largely as a consequence of his photographs' popularity, the town became a tourist resort with good hotels." Edward Chaney, an expert on the evolution of the Grand Tour and of Anglo-Italian cultural relations, described the town as attracting "male refugees from more repressive climates".
 
The mayor of the town in 1872–1882 was the German landscape painter  (1843–1939), who had moved there in 1863. Through him, Gloeden became acquainted with the local inhabitants. He set up his photographic studio at first as a hobby and was exhibiting his work internationally by 1893 (London), including Cairo (1897), Berlin (1898–99, including a solo exhibition), Philadelphia (1902), Budapest & Marseilles (1903), Nice (1903 & 1905), Riga (1905), Dresden (1909) and Rome (World Fair 1911). His well-known study of two young boys clinging to an Ionic column was published in The Studio (London) in June 1893 (above a nude study by Baron Corvo of Cecil Castle, cousin of Charles Kains Jackson), which brought his work to the notice of a wider public.
 
In 1895, when his family's fortune was lost through the "Hammerstein affair", Gloeden received as a gift from his friend and patron the Grand Duke of Mecklenburg-Schwerin, a large-format plate camera. Soon his work brought him visitors from Europe, including royalty, industrialists, artists, and writers (Oscar Wilde visited in December 1897). In 1930, Gloeden ceased work as a photographer and sold his house on the Piazza San Domenico in return for an annuity and residence rights.
 

 
Gloeden scrupulously shared the proceeds of his sales with his models. The names of some of them are known: Pasquale Stracuzzi (known as "Pasqualino"); Vincenzo Lupicino (known as "Virgilio" & seen in the "Boy with Flying Fish" photographs); Peppino Caifasso or Carafasso (who posed as "Ahmed"); Pietro Caspano or Capanu; Nicola Scilio, also spelt Sciglio; Giuseppe De Cristoforo; and Maria Intelisano (niece of the parish priest of nearby Castelmola).
 
His cousin Guglielmo Plüschow (1852–1930), also a photographer of nudes, helped von Gloeden get more familiar with the technical side of photography (until then von Gloeden had not been a hobby photographer). Other important teachers of von Gloeden were local photographer Giovanni Crupi (1859–1925) in the Via Teatro Greco and the pharmacist/photographer Giuseppe Bruno (1836–1904) in the Corso.

Works

 
While today Gloeden is mainly known for his nudes, and is considered "one of the founders of modern homosexual iconography", in his lifetime he was also famous for his landscape photography that helped popularize tourism to Italy. In addition, he documented damage from the 1908 Messina earthquake, which may explain why the locals mostly approved of his work.
 
The majority of Gloeden's pictures were made before the First World War, in the years from 1890 to 1910. During the war, he had to leave Italy. After returning in 1918, he photographed very little but continued to make new prints from his voluminous archives. In 1933, some 1,000 glass negatives from Gloeden's collection (inherited by Buciuni) and 2,000 prints were confiscated by Benito Mussolini's Fascist police under the allegation that they constituted pornography, and were destroyed; another 1,000 negatives were destroyed in 1936, but Buciuni was tried and cleared at a court in Messina (1939–1941) of disseminating pornographic images.

Attitudes towards his work during his lifetime and later
Gloeden generally made several different kinds of photographs. The ones that garnered the most widespread attention in Europe and overseas were usually relatively chaste studies of peasants, shepherds, fisherman, etc., featured in clothing like togas or Sicilian traditional costume, and which generally downplayed their homoerotic implications. He also photographed landscapes and some studies were of, or included, women. His models were usually posed either at his house, among the local ancient ruins, or on Monte Ziretto, located two kilometres to the north of Taormina and famous in antiquity for its quarries of red marble. He wrote in 1898: "The Greek forms appealed to me, as did the bronze-hued descendants of the ancient Hellenes, and I attempted to resurrect the old, classic life in pictures...The models usually remained merry and cheerful, lightly clad and at ease in the open air, striding forward to the accompaniment of flutes and animated chatter. More than a few greatly enjoyed the work and anxiously awaited the moment when I would show them the finished picture."
 
More explicit photos in which boys aged between about 10 and 20, and occasionally older men, were nude (sometimes with prominent genitalia) and which, because of eye contact or physical contact were more sexually suggestive, were traded "under the counter" and among close friends of the photographer, but "as far as is known, Gloeden's archive contained neither pornographic nor erotically lascivious motifs".

Other similar photographers at the time
Gloeden's cousin Guglielmo Plüschow also photographed male nudes, working in Rome. Plüschow was already a firmly established photographer when Gloeden started doing photographs of his own in the early 1890s. It is even speculated that Gloeden was taught the (then difficult) art of photography by Plüschow. However, Gloeden soon eclipsed Plüschow, and later works by Plüschow often were erroneously attributed to Gloeden. From an artistic standpoint, Plüschow's work is somewhat inferior to Gloeden's as his lighting is often too harsh and the poses of his models look quite stilted.
 
Up until 1907, Plüschow's assistant Vincenzo Galdi secretly made work which he tried to pass off as Plüschow's own. However, Galdi's pictures lack elegance, often feature females, and generally tend to border on the pornographic.

Gallery

Major exhibitions
Royal Photographic Society, London: 1893 (21 pictures shown); 1895 (3); 1907 (10); 1908 (3)
British Journal of Photography Exhibition, London, January 1909 (60 Gloeden prints, half of them studies of youths & maidens)
Internationale Ausstellung zur Amateurphotographie, Berlin (1899)
Baron Wilhelm von Gloeden, Kunsthalle Basel (1979)
Wilhelm von Gloeden – Auch ich in Arkadien, MEWO Kunsthalle Memmingen (2008): 400 photos on exhibit, 800 in the catalog

References

Further reading
Baron Wilhelm von Gloeden (1856–1931). Kunsthalle Basel (1979) Exhibition catalog, vol 4 devoted to von Gloeden (48 pages, 27 illus.).
'Wilhelm Von Pluschow and Wilhelm Von Gloeden': Two Photo Essays. (IN: Studies in Visual Communications. Volume 9, Number 2, Spring 1983).
Roger Peyrefitte: Les Amours Singulières (Paris, Gallimard, 1949 & later editions)
Peter Weiermair: Wilhelm Von Gloeden: Erotic Photographs. (Cologne, Taschen Verlag, 1994) 
Peter Weiermair: Wilhelm von Gloeden (Cologne, Taschen Verlag, 1996) (96 pages, mainly illus. 22 cm; text in Ger., Engl. & Fr.) 
Charles Leslie: Wilhelm Von Gloeden Photographer. A Brief Introduction to His Life and Work. (SoHo Photographic Publishers, New York, 1977) (143 pages, 31 cm). Library of Congress Catalog Card Number 77-83146.
Charles Leslie: Wilhelm von Gloeden, 1856–1931: eine Einführung in Sein Leben u. Werk (Innsbruck, Allerheiligenpresse, 1980) (137 pages) (German edition of 1977 book)
Ulrich Pohlmann: Wilhelm von Gloeden: Taormina, (Munich, Schirmer Mosel, 1998) (95 pages, 53 illus., 21 cm), German edition:  English edition:  (Dr Pohlmann is head of the photographic archive at the Munich City Museum.)
Ulrich Pohlmann: Wilhelm von Gloeden. Sehnsucht nach Arkadien (Berlin, Nishen, 1987) (159 pages, mainly illus., 27x22cm) Issued in conjunction with an exhibition at the Stadt Museum, Munich. 
Roger Peyrefitte: Wilhelm von Gloeden, (biography and 50 pictures of nudes by Gloeden). Editions Textes Gais, Paris (2008), 
Tobias G. Natter & Peter Weiermair (editors): Et in Arcadia Ego: Turn-of-the-Century Photography (82 full page photographs, 25 by Gloeden, with introduction, assessment & biographical chronology; texts are in English & German.) (Edition Oehrli, Zurich, 2000) 
Jack Woody (ed.): Taormina: Wilhelm von Gloeden (Pasadena, Twelvetrees Press, 1986) (112 pages, mainly illus. 35 cm)  (2nd edition 1990, 3rd 1997)
Jean-Claude Lemagny: Photographs of the classic male nude, Baron Wilhelm von Gloeden (New York, Camera/Graphic Press, 1977) (105 pages, mainly illus. 24 cm) 
Hans-Joachim Schickedanz (ed.): Wilhelm von Gloeden. Akte in Arkadien (Dortmund, Harenberg, 1987) (167 pages, 80 illus., some double-paged, 17.5 cm)   (New edition also 167 pages: Munich, Orbis, 2000 )
Vincenzo Galdi – Wilhelm von Gloeden – Wilhelm von Plüschow. Aktaufnahmen aus der Sammlung Scheid (Bibliothek des Blicks, Vol. 3: Aachen, Rimbaud-Verlag, 1993) (2nd revised edition 2009)
Ekkehard Hieronimus: Wilhelm von Gloeden. Photographien als Beschwörung (Aachen, Rimbaud-Presse, 1982) (62 pages 21 cm) 
Zannier, Italo (ed.) Exhibition catalogue (Milano Palazzo della Ragione 2008): Wilhelm von Gloeden: fotografie, nudi, paesaggi, scene di genere (Florence, Alinari, 2008) (191 pages, 154 illus. of a wide range of subjects from the Fratelli Alinari & Milan Civic Photographic Archive collections, with detailed catalogue, 29 cm; text in Engl. & Ital.) 
Joseph Kiermeier-Debre & Fritz Franz Vogel (eds.): Wilhelm von Gloeden – Auch ich in Arkadien (Vienna & Cologne, Böhlau Verlag, Oct. 2007) (208 pages, 350 col. illus., 34 cm) 
Galerie Au Bonheur du Jour Nicole Canet Editions : Paradis Siciliens, Paysages, portraits, Nus 1890–1905 (Paris, 2008) (96 pages, 65 illus.) 

Nicole Canet: Wilhelm von Gloeden, Wilhelm von Pluschow, Vincenzo Galdi – Beautés Siciliennes (Photographies 1880 – 1915: Portraits, Scenes de genre et Nus) (Paris, 2014) with French & English texts (most of the 246 pages are illustrated) |url=http://www.aubonheurdujour.net/Beautes_Siciliennes.html |

External links

Biography and gallery of his work #1
Biography and gallery of his work #2
Biography and gallery of his work #3
Wilhelm von Gloeden (1856–1931). Bibliography and original documents, mostly in Italian.
 Von Gloeden and his work
 

 

1856 births
1931 deaths
Gay photographers
German erotic photographers
German gay artists
German LGBT photographers
Photographers from Mecklenburg-Western Pomerania
People from Taormina
Photography in Italy
Nude photography
German expatriates in Italy
Photographers from Sicily